The Central Anatolia Region is a geographical region of Turkey. The largest city in the region is Ankara. Other big cities are Konya, Kayseri, Eskişehir, Sivas, and Aksaray.

Located in Central Turkey, it is bordered by the Aegean Region to the west, the Black Sea Region to the north, the Eastern Anatolia Region to the east, and the Mediterranean Region to the south. It also shares a very slight border with the Marmara Region in Bilecik Province.

Subdivisions 

 Konya Section
 Obruk Plateau
 Konya - Ereğli Vicinity
 Upper Sakarya Section
 Ankara Area
 Porsuk Gully
 Sündiken Mountain Chain Area
 Upper Sakarya Gully
 Middle Kızılırmak Section
 Upper Kızılırmak Section

Ecoregions

Terrestrial

Palearctic 
Palearctic regions include:

Temperate broadleaf and mixed forests
Temperate broadleaf and mixed forests include:
 Central Anatolian deciduous forests
 Eastern Anatolian deciduous forests

Temperate coniferous forests
Temperate coniferous forests are Northern Anatolian conifer and deciduous forests.

Temperate grasslands, savannas and shrublands

Central Anatolian steppe are classified as Temperate grasslands, savannas and shrublands.

Mediterranean forests, woodlands, and scrub
Mediterranean forests, woodlands, and scrub include:
 Anatolian conifer and deciduous mixed forests                      
 Southern Anatolian montane conifer and deciduous forests

Provinces 
Provinces that are entirely in the Central Anatolia Region:
 Aksaray
 Kırıkkale
 Kırşehir
 Nevşehir
 Niğde

Provinces that are mostly in the Central Anatolia Region:
 Ankara
 Çankırı
 Eskişehir
 Karaman
 Kayseri
 Konya
 Sivas
 Yozgat

Provinces that are partially in the Central Anatolia Region:
 Afyonkarahisar
 Bilecik
 Çorum
 Erzincan

Climate
Central Anatolia has a semi-arid continental climate with hot, dry summers and cold, snowy winters. Most of the region usually has low precipitation throughout the year.

See also 
 Geography of Turkey
 Lycaonia
 Galatia
 Phyrgia
 Anatolia
 Eastern Anatolia Region
 Southeastern Anatolia Region

References

External links 
 

 
Regions of Turkey